K. B. Purso was a member of the legislative assembly (1967–1971) from Karwar constituency to the Karnataka state, Bangalore in India when Veerendra Patil was the Chief Minister of Karnataka.

References
 Election Commission of India Statistical report - 1967 Karnataka state assembly elections

Kannada people
Mysore MLAs 1967–1972
People from Karwar
Possibly living people